Arnoldo's Ristorantino is an Argentine children's television series, produced by Non Stop Producciones for Disney Junior and the streaming service Disney+, aired January 21 and May 21, 2021. It is a spin-off of the series Junior Express.

Plot
In Bahía Bonita, a small town by the sea, Arnoldo opens his Ristorantino with Francis who is now Head of Waiters. Arnoldo will revive the place by creating unique food experiences with his delicious and healthy dishes. But he's going to have some competition: the villain siblings, Malú and Keno Malvatti, who produce and sell processed food from a very techie food truck that they park right in front of the Ristorantino. In each episode, Arnoldo and his team try to delight Ristorantino's clients despite the Malvattis' hilarious plans to sabotage them. Here, music, friendship, and fun will always be the main ingredients!

Cast and characters
 Diego Topa as Arnoldo
 Julio Graham as Francis
 Mica Romano as Alina
 Ignacio Riva Palacio as Keno
 Julia Tozzi as Fiore
 Belén Pasqualini as Malú
 Ana María Cores as Margarita

List of episodes
 La inaguración: The Ristorantino is inaugurated, and the place receives its first customers.
 La Malúracha: Malú creates a robot cockroach to scare away Arnoldo's clients.
 La feria del limón: An annual fair is held in Bahía Bonita, where there are games for the town and Francis represents the ristorantino in the tournament.
 Palillos: A client comes from China, but Arnoldo behaves like a stubborn, because the cook does not respect the customs of the Asian.
 Yo no fui: Fiore makes a big mess when she takes control of the ristorantino while Arnoldo is away.
 La cuchara de arnoldo: Fiore loses Arnoldo's grandmother's spoon and the ristorantino workers try to find it without the chef noticing.
 Concurso de video: The Ristorantino participates in a contest for the best video of Bahia Bonita.
 Una visita especial: Capitulo emotivo en donde el Capitan Topa se reencuentra con sus viejos amigos Francis y Arnoldo en Bahia Bonita-
 Pirata Bostezo: Arnoldo is scared after hearing the legend of the Pirate Yawn, in which he said that a pirate was taking over Bahia Bonita.
 Fruta del corazón: María offends Margarita and there is an argument between them, while Francis, Alina and Fiore try to befriend them.
 Picnic de Margarita: The door of the ristorantino is blocked, so the place welcomes its customers on the street.
 La Malúrobot: Malú creates a robot that changes the temperature of the environment and with that makes the Ristorantino more hot.
 Malvatti vs Malvatti: The brothers Keno and Malú face off to see who is the first to get a highly coveted flower from Arnoldo.
 Nuevo camarero: Keno, disguised as a waiter, sets France up to make him look bad at the sailor's festival.
 Galletas de Margarita: The episode was dark during the early morning of a stormy night in Bahía Bonita, in which Margarita eats the cookies that she was going to give Arnoldo, but she was overcome by her temptation and ate all of them. The team tries to discover who the alleged thief is.
 El arqueólogo: A curious archaeologist goes to the Ristorantino after a long journey of expedition.
 Menú de Arnoldo: Arnoldo opens his menu at the Ristorantino and receives a peculiar visit.
 La Princesa: Malú, dressed as a princess, visits the restaurant to make tricky plans: she insults and offends Francis, Alina and Fiore, but the chef Arnoldo does not pay attention to his team's comments, so the waiter, the receptionist and the chef's niece decide give up.  It is there that Arnoldo learns a great lesson.

Soundtrack

El Ristorantino de Arnoldo (Banda Sonora Original) is the soundtrack for the series of the same name, it was originally released in Argentina on January 29, 2021 by Walt Disney Records in Spanish, in the format of  streaming digital.

Track listing

References

External links
 
 

2021 Argentine television series debuts
2021 Argentine television series endings
Argentine children's television series
Musical television series
Television series by Disney
Disney Junior original programming
Disney+ original programming
2020s preschool education television series